Wheeling Warehouse Historic District is a national historic district located at Wheeling, Ohio County, West Virginia. The district includes 20 contributing buildings and 11 contributing structures.  They are warehouses and commercial style buildings and structures between Main Street and the Ohio River. All of the buildings date to the late-19th and early-20th century.  The warehouses are mostly two- and three-story masonry buildings.  The two-story commercial buildings have storefronts on the first floor and residential units above.  Notable buildings and structures include the Pump Store (1933), Wheeling Stamping Plant (1932), Allied Plate Glass (c. 1920), Warwick China (c. 1887), Boury Warehouse (c. 1894), Ott-Heiskell Company (c. 1871), Edward Wagner Wholesale Grocers building (1915), the Moderne style former Greyhound Bus Station, and Main Street Bridge (1891).

It was listed on the National Register of Historic Places in 2002, with a boundary increase in 2022.

References

External links

Commercial buildings on the National Register of Historic Places in West Virginia
Buildings designated early commercial in the National Register of Historic Places in West Virginia
Historic districts in Wheeling, West Virginia
Moderne architecture in West Virginia
Warehouses on the National Register of Historic Places
National Register of Historic Places in Wheeling, West Virginia
Historic districts on the National Register of Historic Places in West Virginia